David de Freitas may refer to:
 David de Freitas (Brazilian footballer) (born 1986), Brazilian football player
 David de Freitas (French footballer) (born 1979), French football player

See also 
 De Freitas (disambiguation)